Ruda Jeżewska  is a village in the administrative district of Gmina Zadzim, within Poddębice County, Łódź Voivodeship, in central Poland.

From 1975 until 1998, Ruda Jeżewska was part of the former Sieradz Voivodeship.

References

Villages in Poddębice County